Kyle Caskey (born December 7, 1978) is a veteran football coach with more than 18 years of National Football League (NFL) and NCAA experience.

Early life and education
Caskey attended Texas A&M University where he played football from 1997 to 1998, and won the Big 12 Championship Game in 1998. Following the 1998 season, he focused his athletic career in track and field from 1999 to 2002, where he competed in discus and earned All-Big 12 honors in 2000.

Coaching career

College
Caskey began his coaching career as a defensive graduate assistant at Louisiana–Monroe in 2004. From 2006 to 2008 he served as a recruiting coordinator for Indiana State. He then served as an intern at Ole Miss, working with the safeties and quality control in 2009.

On May 20, 2021, he was hired as an offensive analyst for LSU. However, he returned to the NFL before the Tigers' season began.

Cincinnati Bengals

On February 25, 2010, Caskey was named offensive quality control coach for the Cincinnati Bengals. On January 10, 2014, Caskey was promoted to running backs coach for the Bengals.

Detroit Lions
On February 26, 2019, Caskey was named running backs coach for the Detroit Lions. During Caskey's time in Detroit in 2019, the Lions had four running backs rush for at least 200 yards, which was the most in the NFL.

Jacksonville Jaguars
On September 9, 2021, Caskey was named offensive quality control coach for the Jacksonville Jaguars.

Personal life
Caskey's father, Bob, played football at Texas A&M from 1958 to 1961. He and his wife, Kayla, have three sons, Olsen, Kolten and Beauden.

References

1978 births
Living people
Cincinnati Bengals coaches
Coaches of American football from Texas
Detroit Lions coaches
Indiana State Sycamores football coaches
Jacksonville Jaguars coaches
Louisiana–Monroe Warhawks football coaches
Ole Miss Rebels football coaches
People from Bryan, Texas
Players of American football from Texas
Texas A&M Aggies football players